Robert Balgarnie Young Scott  (1899–1987), known as R. B. Y. Scott, was a minister of the United Church of Canada and an Old Testament scholar.

Biography
Scott was born on 16 July 1899 in Toronto, Ontario, the son of John McPherson Scott (a Presbyterian Church in Canada minister). He was a graduate of Knox College, University of Toronto, and the University of Toronto where he received a Bachelor of Arts degree in 1922, a Master of Arts degree in 1924, and a Doctor of Philosophy degree in 1928. He was ordained in the United Church of Canada in 1926.

He started teaching at Union College of British Columbia in Vancouver in 1928. In 1931, he moved to Montreal where he was a professor of Old Testament language and literature at the United Theological College. From 1948 until 1955, he taught Old Testament at McGill University. In 1947, he became the first Dean of the Faculty of Divinity at McGill University. He was a member of the World Council of Churches from 1949 to 1955.

In 1951, he "helped recover several fragments of the Dead Sea Scrolls ... that had found their way into the hands of private dealers in Bethlehem."

In 1955, he was appointed the Danforth Professor of Religion  at Princeton University. He was chairman of the department from 1963 to 1965. He retired in 1968. He was President of the Canadian Society of Biblical Studies from 1971 to 1972.

He is noted for his staunch support for the social gospel ethos of the United Church, both at Princeton and at home in Canada and for some 10 of his 24 hymns, many written in the cause of the Fellowship for a Christian Social Order, especially the social gospel hymn "O Day of God, Draw Nigh" which is found in the hymnals of the United Church of Canada, the Anglican Church of Canada, the Presbyterian Church in Canada, the joint hymnal of the Uniting, Anglican, Roman Catholic, Lutheran, and Church of Christ churches of Australia, and in hymnals of British and US churches. It was sung at Westminster Abbey at the memorial service for John Smith, the leader of the British Labour Party.

His published writings include Towards the Christian Revolution (1936), Relevance of the Prophets (1953); Treasures from Judaean Caves (1955); The Psalms as Christian Praise (1958); Proverbs and Ecclesiastes (1965) in the Anchor Bible Series; The Way of Wisdom, (1971)

He died on 1 November 1987 in Toronto.

References

Footnotes

Bibliography

External links
The R.B.Y. Scott award of the Canadian Society of Biblical Studies

1987 deaths
1899 births
20th-century Canadian male writers
20th-century Canadian non-fiction writers
20th-century Presbyterian ministers
20th-century scholars
Biblical archaeology
Canadian biblical scholars
Canadian Christian socialists
Canadian hymnwriters
Canadian Presbyterian ministers
Canadian university and college faculty deans
Christian hymnwriters
Fellows of the Royal Society of Canada
Academic staff of McGill University
Ministers of the United Church of Canada
Old Testament scholars
People of the World Council of Churches
Presbyterian hymnwriters
Presbyterian socialists
Princeton University faculty
University of Toronto alumni
Writers from Toronto